Oaxaca Fault is a seismic fault that runs near Oaxaca city, Oaxaca, Mexico.  It runs north on the east side of the city from Etla Valley.  Donaji Fault is a nearby fault that runs roughly perpendicular to Oaxaca Fault at its southern end.

References

Geology of Mexico
Seismic faults of Mexico